Jong Il-gwan (Hangul: 정일관, Hancha: 鄭日冠, born 30 October 1992) is a North Korean football striker who plays as a striker for club Rimyongsu in the DPR Korea Premier Football League and the North Korea national team.

Club career
On 24 November 2010, he was crowned AFC Youth Player of the Year. On 5 June 2012 numerous reports surfaced linking the player with a move to Newcastle United with later reports strongly linking him with FK Partizan and PSV Eindhoven. He was transferred to Swiss Super League club FC Luzern in July 2017, signing a two-year contract.

International career
Il-gwan made his senior international debut for North Korea on 26 March 2011 against Iraq in a 2–0 defeat.

International goals
Scores and results list North Korea's goal tally first.

Honours

International
North Korea
Hero Intercontinental Cup: 2019

Individual
Hero Intercontinental Cup Best player: 2019

References

External links

1992 births
Living people
North Korean footballers
North Korea international footballers
Association football forwards
Asian Young Footballer of the Year winners
2015 AFC Asian Cup players
2019 AFC Asian Cup players
Asian Games medalists in football
Footballers at the 2014 Asian Games
Asian Games silver medalists for North Korea
Medalists at the 2014 Asian Games
Swiss Challenge League players
FC Luzern players
FC Wil players
Expatriate footballers in Switzerland